Ronald Harold Carruthers (26 August 1918 – 2 July 2004) was an Australian rules footballer who played with Collingwood in the Victorian Football League (VFL).

Career
Carruthers was a centreman and wingman, recruited locally by Collingwood, from Abbotsford. He played only briefly in his first few seasons before making 10 league appearances in 1943. His best season came in 1945 when he appeared in 17 games, which included two finals, narrow losses to South Melbourne in the semi-final and Carlton in the preliminary final. A knee injury ended his 1946 season in round six. He returned late in the 1947 VFL season, to play the last five rounds.

In 1953, Carruthers won the 75 and 100 yard sprints at the Stawell Gift. He had taken up running during his time at Collingwood, but these were the first major races that he had won.

Family
He was the father of Ron E. Carruthers, who played for Collingwood in 1961.

References

External links

1918 births
Australian rules footballers from Victoria (Australia)
Collingwood Football Club players
Australian male sprinters
2004 deaths